Boulderwood  is a Residential subdivision in Armdale on  Mainland Halifax within the Halifax Regional Municipality Nova Scotia on the shore of the Northwest Arm in Halifax Harbour .

References
 Destination Nova Scotia

Communities in Halifax, Nova Scotia